Anolis triumphalis is a species of lizard in the family Dactyloidae. The species is known with confidence only from its holotype collected in Darién, Panama, although there is an unconfirmed sighting also from Colombia.

References

Anoles
Lizards of North America
Reptiles of Panama
Endemic fauna of Panama
Reptiles described in 2014
Taxa named by Gunther Köhler